The Ohio Match Company Railway was a logging railroad in northern Idaho that operated from Garwood, Idaho, around Hayden Lake and followed the Burnt Cabin Creek to the Little North Fork of the Coeur d'Alene River. The right of way roughly follows Ohio Match Road from Garwood, Idaho Burnt Cabin Road and then over the entirety of Burnt Cabin Road today. The Ohio Match railroad aided in harvesting white pine timber reserves that remained after the fire of 1910 for the production of matchsticks.

History 

Perl Bailey managed the Ohio Match Company’s western operation. H. A. Biggs was the engineer tasked with building the Ohio Match Railway. The Ohio Match railroad connected 80,000 million acres of white pine timber reserves that remained after the fire of 1910 to the Atlas Tie Co. in Hayden, Idaho, to the Spokane International in Garwood, Idaho, and the Spokane, Coeur d'Alene and Palouse electric railroad in Hayden, Idaho, which brought lumber to Lake Coeur d'Alene to be floated to mills in and around Coeur d'Alene, Idaho. The Ohio Match Company served two mines, the Inland Mine (Burnt Cabin Prospect) and Commonwealth Mine, along its route. The Ohio Match Railway costed $1,000,000 in 1924 (Roughly $16,000,000 in 2022 or $650,000 per mile) to construct. Two of Ohio Match Railway’s locomotives, a climax and a shay, were sold to the U.S. Navy in 1940 to aid in the construction of Farragut Naval Base in Farragut, Idaho at the start of World War II.

Preservation

Preserved rolling stock 
The Ohio Match Railroad's Shay and Climax were sold to the U.S. Navy in 1940 to construct Farragut Naval Base in Farragut, Idaho and scrapped by the U.S. Navy in 1944 for war materials. Two Ohio Match Railroad Heisler locomotives are preserved, but non-operational as of 2022.

 Ohio Match Company Three-Truck Heisler No. 1 was sold to Potlatch Lumber and renumbered 92 before being donated to the city of Lewiston, Idaho, in 1963 where it currently sits on display in the open as of 2022.
 Ohio Match Company Two-Truck Heisler No. 4 is kept displayed indoors at Northwest Railway Museum's train shed in Snoqualamie, Washington, in fairly rough shape as of 2022.

See also 
 Spokane International Railway
 Spokane and Inland Empire Railway
 Steamboats on Lake Coeur d'Alene

References

External links 

 GearedSteam.com picture archive O section
 Burnt Cabin Prospect (Inland Mine)
 Commonwealth Mine
Idaho railroads
Defunct Idaho railroads
Standard gauge railways in the United States 
Mining in Idaho